The Battle of Neumarkt-Sankt Veit on 24 April 1809 saw a Franco-Bavarian force led by Marshal Jean-Baptiste Bessières face an Austrian Empire army commanded by Johann von Hiller. Hiller's numerically superior force won a victory over the Allied troops, forcing Bessières to retreat to the west. Neumarkt-Sankt Veit is located ten kilometers north of Mühldorf and 33 kilometers southeast of Landshut in Bavaria.

On 10 April 1809, Archduke Charles, Duke of Teschen's surprise invasion of the Kingdom of Bavaria put the Grande Armée of Emperor Napoleon I of France at a disadvantage. On 19 April, Charles failed to take advantage of his opportunities and Napoleon struck back with savage force against the Austrian left wing under Hiller. After battles on 20 and 21 April, Hiller's troops were driven into a headlong retreat to the southeast.

Having temporarily disposed of Hiller, Napoleon turned north with his main army against Archduke Charles. On 22 and 23 April, the Franco-Germans defeated Charles' army and forced it to withdraw to the north bank of the Danube. Meanwhile, Napoleon sent Bessières to pursue the Austrian left wing with minor forces. Not knowing that Charles had been defeated, Hiller turned back upon his pursuer, defeating Bessières near Neumarkt-Sankt Veit. Once he found that he was alone on the south bank facing Napoleon's main army, Hiller retreated rapidly to the east in the direction of Vienna.

Background
On 10 April 1809, Archduke Charles invaded the Kingdom of Bavaria with 209,000 Austrian soldiers and 500 artillery pieces. A set of orders from Emperor Napoleon in Paris was transmitted poorly and misunderstood by Marshal Louis Alexandre Berthier. By the time Napoleon arrived at the front on the 17th, his Franco-German army invited defeat in detail. On the morning of the 19th, Charles gained a position in which he might have severely punished Marshal Louis Davout's isolated III Corps. Instead, Davout escaped defeat in the hard-fought Battle of Teugen-Hausen.

On 20 April, the Austrian left wing was strung-out on a 13 kilometer front behind the Abens River from Mainburg in the south to Biburg in the north. The left wing consisted of the V Armeekorps under Feldmarschall-Leutnant Archduke Louis of Austria, the VI Armeekorps led by Feldmarschall-Leutnant Hiller, the small II Reserve Armeekorps commanded by Feldmarschall-Leutnant Michael von Kienmayer, and a detachment from the III Armeekorps. In total, there were about 42,000 Austrians. Napoleon launched 55,000 troops at his enemies in the Battle of Abensberg, inflicting 6,710 casualties, and forcing them to retreat. In command of the left wing since his arrival that morning, Hiller elected to continue withdrawing southeast toward Landshut, thus separating Hiller's three corps from Archduke Charles' main body near Regensburg.

Napoleon beat Hiller again in the Battle of Landshut on 21 April, seizing a crossing over the Isar River and driving the Austrians farther to the southeast. Until 2:30 am on 22 April, Napoleon mistakenly believed that Hiller's three corps represented the main Austrian army. When he realized his error, he sent most of his troops marching north to crush Archduke Charles. On 22 April, the Franco-Germans defeated Charles at the Battle of Eckmühl and forced him to withdraw through Regensburg to the north bank of the Danube the following day. Napoleon instructed Bessières to pursue Hiller and placed him in charge of one reinforced cavalry division and two infantry divisions.

The bulk of Hiller's force, numbering 27,000 to 28,000 troops, lay near Mühldorf and Neuötting on the Inn River at noon on 23 April. A 10,000-strong division under Feldmarschall-Leutnant Franz Jellacic held Munich. Feldmarschall-Leutnant Dedovich's brigade from the IV Armeekorps, which had been blockading Passau, was assigned to Hiller's command and moved to Braunau am Inn. Hiller noticed that the French pursuit had slackened on the 22nd and 23rd and decided to counterattack. A letter from Emperor Francis I urging him to help defend Archduke Charles' south flank strengthened the left wing commander's resolve. Neither the emperor nor Hiller realized that Charles had withdrawn to the north bank of the Danube.

Battle

On the night of 22 April, Napoleon instructed Bessières to advance with Lieutenant General Karl Philipp von Wrede's Bavarian division from the VII Corps, General of Division Gabriel Jean Joseph Molitor's French infantry division from the IV Corps, and General of Brigade Jacob François Marulaz's IV Corps cavalry division. The emperor planned for the pursuit to cross the Inn and capture Braunau am Inn. On the 24th, Napoleon ordered Marshal François Joseph Lefebvre, the commander of VII Corps, to take the division of Lieutenant General the Crown Prince of Bavaria to recapture Munich from Jellacic. If necessary, he could call on Lieutenant General Deroy's Bavarian division also. Bessières, with Wrede's division, reached Neumarkt-Sankt Veit on 22 April. From there he sent Marulaz to probe toward the Inn River.

Late on 23 April, Hiller recrossed the Inn at Mühldorf and ordered Jellacic to advance from Munich toward Landshut. That day, Marulaz's advance guard marched southeast toward the Inn. A short distance north of Mühldorf at the village of Erharting, the 3rd Chasseurs à Cheval Regiment collided with Hiller's advance elements. The French horsemen were quickly driven back on two supporting units, the 19th Chasseurs à Cheval and an infantry battalion. Marulaz pulled back in the direction of Neumarkt-Sankt Veit.

On the morning of 24 April, Hiller advanced in three columns. His right column of 12 infantry battalions and nine cavalry squadrons attacked Wrede at 8:00 am. The Bavarian general held high ground to the southeast of Neumarkt with 10 battalions and eight squadrons. On the far right, an advance guard under Joseph Radetzky von Radetz felt its way to the north toward Landau an der Isar. Hiller's center column struck Marulaz's position and drove the cavalry back. In addition to his own division, Marulaz had General of Brigade Charles Claude Jacquinot's light cavalry brigade from the III Corps attached.

In the face of Austrian assaults, Wrede held his ground until noon. Seeing that the opposing flanking columns threatened to envelop his Bavarians, Bessières ordered a retreat about 1:00 pm. By this time, Molitor had arrived from Vilsbiburg and sent two regiments to cover Wrede's retreat while holding his other two regiments in reserve. Nevertheless, the Austrians continued to press the Bavarians hard and captured Neumarkt at about 3:00 pm. Wrede's soldiers suffered significant losses as they struggled across the Rott River. Once his enemies got across the Rott, which runs eastward into the Inn near Schärding, Hiller called off the battle. Bessières conducted an orderly retreat to Vilsbiburg.

Result
Francis Loraine Petre gives Austrian casualties as 776 killed and wounded, plus 122 captured. He writes that Wrede lost 586 killed and wounded. Digby Smith lists 1,692 Bavarians killed and wounded, plus another 910 missing or captured. Smith notes that the Austrians lost 800 casualties. To Smith's total must be added Bessières' reported losses of 200 among the cavalry. On the night of 24 April, Hiller got word of the defeat of Archduke Charles and immediately pulled back to Neuötting.

Jellacic was unable to carry out his orders to threaten Landshut. He found out about Archduke Charles' defeat and evacuated Munich on the evening of the 23rd. When Jellacic got Hiller's orders of the 23rd, he tried to reoccupy Munich. Before he reached the Bavarian capital, he received new orders from Hiller instructing him to retreat to Salzburg. Eventually, General of Division Paul Grenier's corps from the Army of Italy crushed Jellacic's wandering division on 25 May at the Battle of Sankt Michael in Styria.

When Napoleon received news of the Battle of Neumarkt, he sent Marshal Jean Lannes with a corps of 25,000 to support Bessières. By this time Hiller was in full retreat to the east. The French emperor directed André Masséna and the IV Corps to take the road to Passau, while Bessières and Lannes (who now led the II Corps) took a route farther south. The next major action was the Battle of Ebelsberg on 3 May.

Order of battle

Austrian forces

Returns from 20 March 1809, less detachments
Left Wing: Feldmarschall-Leutnant Johann von Hiller
 VI Armeekorps: Feldmarschall-Leutnant Johann von Hiller. Less Jellacic's detachment.
 Reserve Artillery: Feldmarschall-Leutnant Karl von Rouvroy
 Three 12-pdr position batteries (18 guns), 6-pdr position battery (6 guns)
 Division: Feldmarschall-Leutnant Friedrich Kottulinsky
 Brigade: General-Major Otto Hohenfeld
 Klebek IR # 14 (3 bns), Jordis IR # 59 (3 bns), 6-pdr brigade battery (8 guns)
 Brigade: General-Major Nikolaus Weissenwolf
 Deutschmeister IR # 4 (3 bns), Kerpen IR # 49 (3 bns), 6-pdr brigade battery (8 guns)
 Artillery: 6-pdr position battery (6 guns)
 Division: Feldmarschall-Leutnant Franz Jellacic (Detached at Munich)
 Brigade: General-Major Konstantin Ettingshausen
 Esterhazy IR # 32 (3 bns), De Vaux IR # 45 (3 bns), 6-pdr brigade battery (8 guns)
 Brigade: General-Major Karl Dollmayer von Provenchères. Jellacic had exchanged Hoffmeister's brigade for Dollmayer's at the beginning of the war.
 Warasdin-Kreutzer Grenz IR # 5 (2 bns), 3-pdr Grenz brigade battery (8 guns)
 O'Reilly Chevau-léger Regt # 3 (8 sqns), 6-pdr cavalry battery (6 guns)
 Artillery: 6-pdr position battery (6 guns)
 Light Division: Feldmarschall-Leutnant Karl von Vincent
 Brigade: General-Major Josef Hoffmeister
 Benjowsky IR # 31 (3 bns), Splenyi IR # 51 (3 bns), 6-pdr brigade battery (8 guns)
 Brigade: General-Major Armand von Nordmann
 Warasdin-St. George Grenz IR # 6 (2 bns), 3-pdr Grenz brigade battery (8 guns)
 Rosenberg Chevau-léger Regt # 6 (8 sqns), Liechtenstein Hussars Regt # 7 (8 sqns), 6-pdr cavalry battery (6 guns)
 4th, 5th, 6th Vienna Freiwilligers Battalions. These units joined Hiller at Moosburg on 18 April. They belonged to Dollmayer's brigade, but since Dollmayer was at Munich, they never joined it.

 V Armeekorps: Feldmarschall-Leutnant Archduke Louis
 Reserve Artillery: Major Adam Pfefferkorn
 Two 12-pdr position batteries (12 guns), 6-pdr cavalry battery (6 guns)
 Brigade III Corps:
 Kaiser IR # 1 (3 bns), Lindenau IR # 29 (3 bns), 6-pdr brigade battery (8 guns)
 Division: Feldmarschall-Leutnant Karl Friedrich von Lindenau (Detached to I Reserve Armeekorps)
 Division: Feldmarschall-Leutnant Prince Heinrich XV of Reuss-Plauen
 Brigade: General-Major Frederick Bianchi, Duke of Casalanza
 Duka IR # 39 (3 bns), Gyulai IR # 60 (3 bns), 6-pdr brigade battery (8 guns)
 Brigade: General-Major Franz Johann Schulz von Rothacker
 Beaulieu IR # 58 (3 bns), 1st, 2nd, 3rd Vienna Freiwilligers Battalions
 Artillery: 6-pdr position battery (6 guns)
 Light Division: Feldmarschall-Leutnant Emmanuel von Schustekh-Herve
 Brigade: General-Major Joseph, Baron von Mesko de Felsö-Kubiny
 Broder Grenz IR # 7 (2 bns), Kienmayer Hussar Regt # 8 (8 sqns), 3-pdr Grenz brigade battery (8 guns)
 Brigade: General-Major Joseph Radetzky von Radetz
 Gradiscaner Grenz IR # 8 (2 bns), Archduke Charles Uhlans Regt # 3 (8 sqns), 6-pdr cavalry battery (6 guns)

 II Reserve Armeekorps: Feldmarschall-Leutnant Michael von Kienmayer. Order of battle.
 Brigade: General-Major Konstantin Ghilian Karl d'Aspré
 Puteani, Brezeczinsky, Scovaud, Kirchenbetter, Scharlach Grenadier bns, 6-pdr brigade battery (8 guns)
 Brigade: General-Major Josef von Clary
 Levenehr Dragoon Regt # 4 (6 sqns), Württemberg Dragoon Regt # 3 (6 sqns), 6-pdr cavalry battery (6 guns)
 Brigade: General-Major Andreas Schneller (Detached to I Reserve Armeekorps)

Key
 IR = Infantry Regiment
 bn, bns = Infantry battalion(s)
 sqn, sqns = Cavalry squadron(s)
 bty, btys = Artillery battery (batteries)
 Regt = Regiment
 3-pdr, 6-pdr, 12-pdr = 3 (light), 6 (medium) and 12 (heavy) pounder field guns.

French-Allied forces

Returns from 16 April 1809
Provisional Corps: Marshal Jean-Baptiste Bessières
 Cavalry Division, IV Corps: General of Brigade Jacob François Marulaz (2,765). Includes three staff members.
 1st Brigade: Commander unknown (1,193)
 19th Chasseurs à Cheval Regt (3 sqns), 23rd Chasseurs à Cheval Regt (3 sqns)
 2nd Brigade: General of Brigade Bertrand Pierre Castex (829)
 3rd Chasseurs à Cheval Regt (3 sqns), 14th Chasseurs à Cheval Regt (3 sqns)
 3rd Brigade: Commander unknown (740)
 Baden Light Dragoon Regt (4 sqns), Hesse-Darmstadt Chevau-léger Regt (3 sqns)
 Cavalry Brigade, III Corps: General of Brigade Charles Claude Jacquinot (1,797)
 1st Chasseurs à Cheval Regt (3 sqns), 2nd Chasseurs à Cheval Regt (3 sqns), 12th Chasseurs à Cheval Regt (3 sqns)
 2nd Bavarian Division, VII Corps: Lieutenant-General Karl Philipp von Wrede (8,944). Includes 250 headquarters guards.
 Brigade: General-Major Minuzzi (3,980)
 6th Laroche Light bn, 3rd Prince Karl IR (2 bns), 13th IR (2 bns)
 Brigade: General-Major Beckers (3,139)
 6th Duc Wilhelm IR (2 bns), 7th Löwenstein IR (2 bns)
 Cavalry Brigade: General-Major Preysing (1,012)
 König Chevau-léger Regt (4 sqns), Leiningen Chevau-léger Regt (4 sqns)
 Artillery: Two 6-pdr foot btys, 6-pdr horse bty (563, 18 guns)

 3rd Division, IV Corps: General of Division Gabriel Jean Joseph Molitor (7,155). Includes 16 staff members.
 Brigade: General of Brigade François Joseph Leguay (3,647)
 2nd Line IR (2 bns), 16th Line IR (3 bns)
 Brigade: General of Brigade Raymond Viviès de La Prade (3,184)
 37th Line IR (3 bns), 67th Line IR (2 bns)
 Artillery: 6-pdr foot bty (308, 6 guns)

Notes

References

Further reading

External links
 The following two websites are excellent sources for the full names of French and Austrian generals.
 French Wikipedia, Liste des généraux de la Révolution et du Premier Empire
 napoleon-series.org Austrian Generals: 1792-1815 by Digby Smith, compiled by Leopold Kudrna
 

Conflicts in 1809
Battles of the War of the Fifth Coalition
Battles of the Napoleonic Wars
Battles involving Austria
Battles involving France
Battles involving Bavaria
1809 in Bavaria
1809 in Germany
April 1809 events
Battles in Bavaria